Stephanie Hirst is an English radio and television presenter currently heard on Hits Radio. She has hosted Hit40UK and the weekday breakfast show on Capital Yorkshire Hirsty's Daily Dose.

Career 

Hirst started her career at age 12 at 96.3 Radio Aire in Leeds as a helper making tea for DJs, where she soon moved up the ranks and was on the overnight show at 16.

Hirst moved onto Minster FM in York, then onto The Pulse of West Yorkshire in Bradford in 1995 to present the evening show. In 1997 she moved to Hallam FM in Sheffield, her local station, where she hosted the drivetime programme for three years. She then returned to The Pulse of West Yorkshire to co-host the breakfast show with Elisa Hilton, but quickly left to take over the breakfast show at Viking FM in Hull – the one area of Yorkshire which had yet to hear her – after the departure of JK and Joel. She and her breakfast team won a Sony Award in 2002.

Hirst left 96.9 Viking FM, to take on the breakfast show (entitled Hirsty's Daily Dose) at Galaxy Yorkshire, a station covering all areas of Yorkshire. The Daily Dose team, led by Hirst, including ex-Viking colleague Danny Oakes and existing Galaxy Yorkshire presenter Joanne (Jojo) Kelly (née Moorhouse) won the title of Commercial Radio Presenter(s) Of The Year at the CRCA Awards, and was nominated in the breakfast category of the 2005 Sony Awards.

After Neil Fox quit as the long-running host of the nationally networked Hit40UK in 2004, Hirst – one of Fox's stand-ins previously from 2003 – was recruited, initially with Katy Hill, to host the programme each Sunday from the studios of Capital Radio in London and went on to host the programme alone. She was up against JK and Joel on BBC Radio 1 for the chart audience on a Sunday afternoon – the presenters whom she succeeded at Viking FM and with whom she remains close friends; in fact, during her chart reign she shared a flat in London with Joel Ross. Also a spin-off TV show Hit40UK TV hosted by Hirst was broadcast on a weekend on Channel 4's youth strand T4. She won a Sony Award for the show in 2006.

During Hit40UK on 2 April 2006, she announced that Gnarls Barkley had made pop history as the UK's first number one song based on download sales alone.

Hirst presented her last Hit40UK chart on 15 October 2006, due to objections from Galaxy's rival Yorkshire radio stations Viking FM, Radio Aire and Hallam FM who were due to start broadcasting the chart on 22 October 2006. They were unhappy that a Galaxy Yorkshire presenter would be heard on their station, since they could possibly lose a proportion of their breakfast audience to Hirst's weekday breakfast show.

In May 2013, Hirst returned to presenting nationally on Gold on Saturday afternoons between 1:00 pm and 5:00 pm, later moving to the earlier time of 12:00 pm and 4:00 pm, where she went on to create a show called 'Vinyl Heaven', with every song played live from the original vinyl copies.

On 20 June 2014, Hirst announced that she had left her presenting roles at Capital and Gold, which brought Hirsty's Daily Dose to an end after 11 years. 2014 also saw her collect a nomination for 'Breakfast Show of the Year' at the Radio Academy Awards (formerly Sony Awards). The final edition had aired on 13 June. Adam O'Neill took over as the main host of the newly named Capital Breakfast with Danny and JoJo remaining co-hosts.

In January 2015, Hirst started work on ITV's morning show 'Lorraine' as part of a strand called 'Change One Thing'. Hirst continues to be part of ITV Lorraine's extended presenter family.

She made a return to radio on 4 July 2015, with a programme called, 'Nothing but the 90s' which was aired on BBC Radio Manchester from 10pm to 12midnight every Saturday. In a 2015 interview she said coming back to radio at a time slot which was somewhat tucked away at night and not in the limelight felt just right, so she could find her new voice without huge pressure.

On 5 March 2016, she started a new radio programme on BBC Radio York called 'Stephanie Hirst's Vinyl Revival'. The show aired every Saturday from 12noon to 2pm for 8 weeks while the usual presenter of that time slot was away on leave. She has also presented a few spin-offs of this show including a 3-hour version for Bauer's 'Greatest Hits Network' and Vinyl top 40 show for the BBC.

As of 3 September 2016, her weekly Saturday night show on BBC Radio Manchester changed to a "Vinyl Revival" show, airing at the same time from 10pm to 12midnight. The show was the only one of its kind on UK radio, with Hirst playing each song live from the original vinyl copies, along with taking live listener requests.

The show was taken off air - initially, according to the BBC,  temporarily - to be replaced by a phone-in during the first Covid-19 lockdown in the UK in March 2020. However, the show never returned. Subsequent announcements that Vinyl Revival would be revived in another format by Hirst have so far come to nothing.

At the Radio Festival which took place at The British Library in London on 26 October 2016, she was awarded a 'Fellowship', the highest honour The Radio Academy may confer upon a member of the radio industry, to recognise her outstanding contribution to British radio and the industry.

In April 2018, Hirst began hosting her first, solo, daily radio show since leaving Capital in 2014. The Stephanie Hirst Show was broadcast on BBC Radio Leeds 9:00-12:00, then moving to 14:00-18:00 during Covid-19. She left the BBC in April 2021.

Alongside her radio career, she has always DJ'ed live. Hirst created her 'Kitchen Belters' brand in 2016 which was born out of DJ'ing in her kitchen when the capability to stream video on Facebook Live arrived in late 2015. Hirst realised early on that a weekly live DJ set of 90s, 00s & 10s dance anthems was something which her followers would connect with whilst getting ready to go out, or cooking their evening meal. The show gained weekly views & replays of 100k+.

From the success of this she made a return to commercial radio for Bauer's Hits Radio Pride, initially a temporary 'pop up' DAB & Online station for the LGBT community, it has subsequently become a full time national radio station. She hosted her first 'Belters' show on 28 August 2020, and can be heard Saturday evenings 19:00-20:00.

From the success of her weekly Hits Radio Pride show, she joined the national Hits Radio network in August 2021 to host 'Stephanie Hirst's Belters' - a 3-hour celebration of the biggest 90s, 00s & 10s dance throwbacks. It has since become one of the most streamed shows on the Hits Radio app.

She also is a trustee of The Radio Academy and a former chair of the Student Radio Awards sponsored by BBC Radio 1 and Global Radio and can be seen on Channel 5 as a occasional panelist on Jeremy Vine.

Transition and activism 
Hirst came out publicly as a woman and talked about her gender transition on 11 October 2014 during an interview with Stephen Nolan on BBC Radio 5 Live. In 2014 and 2015 Hirst was included in The Independent On Sundays "Rainbow List", an annual celebration of 101 LGBT people in the UK.

In June 2016, she was one of the prominent faces of Pride In London's 'No Filter' campaign. The manifesto film, which starred Hirst alongside Sir Ian McKellen and Graham Norton, explored what 'No Filter' means to the LGBT+ community. A second short film was made with Hirst describing her first 'No Filter' moment and shown daily within London's Westfield centre. In July 2016, Hirst was awarded an Honorary Doctorate from Leeds Beckett University for her LGBT activism. In February 2017, Hirst was nominated for a British LGBT Award in the 'Top 10 LGBT+ Celebrity' category.

References

External links 
Stephanie Hirst's Belters on Hits Radio Pride (Hits Radio Pride)
Stephanie Hirst's Belters on Hits Radio (Hits Radio)
The Throwback on Hits Radio (Hits Radio)

Stephanie Hirst on her transition

Living people
British radio personalities
British radio DJs
Capital (radio network)
People from Barnsley
Transgender women
Transgender writers
English LGBT people
LGBT DJs
Transgender musicians
British LGBT broadcasters
British LGBT journalists
Year of birth missing (living people)